Strictly Business is a 1931 British comedy film directed by Mary Field and Jacqueline Logan and starring Betty Amann, Carl Harbord and Molly Lamont. It was made at Welwyn Studios as a quota quickie.

Cast
 Betty Amann as Theodora Smith  
 Carl Harbord as David Plummett  
 Molly Lamont as Maureen  
 Percy Parsons as Mr. Smith  
 Philip Strange as Bartling  
 C. M. Hallard as Mr. Plummett  
 Gordon Begg as Stormont

References

Bibliography
 Chibnall, Steve. Quota Quickies: The Birth of the British 'B' Film. British Film Institute, 2007.
 Low, Rachael. Filmmaking in 1930s Britain. George Allen & Unwin, 1985.
 Wood, Linda. British Films, 1927-1939. British Film Institute, 1986.

External links

1931 films
British comedy films
1931 comedy films
Films shot at Welwyn Studios
Quota quickies
British black-and-white films
1930s English-language films
1930s British films